Isabella Motadinyane (1963 – 2003) was a South African poet, performance poet and actor.

She was born in Soweto and was a founding member of the Botsotso Jesters poetry group, and was on the editorial board of Botsotso Publishing, both named after a line from one of her poems "die is mos bosotsos". She wrote and performed in a number of languages, including English, Sotho, Camtho and Afrikaans.

Works 
 We Jive Like This, Botsotso Publishing, 1996
 Dirty Washing, Botsotso Publishing, 1999
 Bella (Collected Works), 2007

References 

South African women poets
1963 births
2003 deaths
20th-century poets
20th-century women writers